The 1991 Georgia Bulldogs football team represented the University of Georgia during the 1991 NCAA Division I-A football season. The Bulldogs completed the season with a 9–3 record.

Schedule

Roster

Rankings

Game summaries

vs. Florida

vs. Arkansas (Independence Bowl)

References

Georgia
Georgia Bulldogs football seasons
Independence Bowl champion seasons
Georgia Bulldogs football